Thor Hanson is an American conservation biologist and author. Hanson has published five books for general audiences and one children's book. He has also contributed to a range of periodicals and other media, including the PBS program, American Spring LIVE.

Career 
Hanson received a bachelor's degree from the University of Redlands, a master's degree from the University of Vermont, and a Ph.D. from the University of Idaho. In the 1990s, Hanson worked as a volunteer for the U.S. Peace Corps in Uganda and managed a tourism project regarding brown bears for the U.S. Forest Service. Outside of writing for general audiences, Hanson has also published "technical research on such topics as the ecology of tropical trees, forest fragmentation and its impact on bird nest predation, the impact that warfare can have on biodiversity hotspots, and the behaviour of Neotropical monkeys and birds." Hanson is a Guggenheim Fellow, and in 1998, he also received the Switzer Environmental Fellowship.

Personal life 
Hanson lives in the U.S. state of Washington with his wife and son.

Works

Books 
 The Impenetrable Forest: My Gorilla Years in Uganda. 1500 Books, 2008. .
 Feathers: The Evolution of a Natural Miracle. Basic Books, 2011. .
 The Triumph of Seeds: How Grains, Nuts, Kernels, Pulses and Pips Conquered the Plant Kingdom and Shaped Human History. Basic Books, 2015. .
 Buzz: The Nature and Necessity of Bees. Basic Books, 2018. .
 Hurricane Lizards and Plastic Squid: The Fraught and Fascinating Biology of Climate Change. Basic Books, 2021. .

Children's books 
 Bartholomew Quill: A Crow's Quest to Know Who's Who. Little Bigfoot/Sasquatch Books, 2016.

References

External links 
 

Living people
Conservation biologists
Writers from Washington (state)
21st-century American non-fiction writers
Year of birth missing (living people)
University of Redlands alumni
University of Vermont alumni
University of Idaho alumni
American conservationists
20th-century American biologists
21st-century American biologists